CSKA won their first Russian title. It was their first championship since the last edition of the Soviet Top League in 1991. Newly promoted Rubin got the bronze.

Teams 
As in the previous season, 16 teams are playing in the 2003 season. After the 2002 season, Anzhi Makhachkala and Sokol Saratov were relegated to the 2003 Russian First Division. They were replaced by Rubin Kazan and Chernomorets Novorossiysk, the winners and runners up of the 2002 Russian First Division.

Venues

Personnel and kits

Managerial changes

Standings

Results

Season statistics

Top goalscorers

Awards 
On November 14 Russian Football Union named its list of 33 top players:

Goalkeepers
  Sergei Ovchinnikov (Lokomotiv Moscow)
  Vyacheslav Malafeev (Zenit)
  Sergei Kozko (Rubin)

Right backs
  Vadim Evseev (Lokomotiv Moscow)
  Deividas Šemberas (CSKA Moscow)
  Andrés Scotti (Rubin)

Right-centre backs
  Sergei Ignashevich (Lokomotiv Moscow)
  Viktor Onopko (Spartak-Alania)
  Matthew Booth (Rostov)

Left-centre backs
  Oleg Pashinin (Lokomotiv Moscow)
  Géder (Saturn)
  Roman Sharonov (Rubin)

Left backs
  Jacob Lekgetho (Lokomotiv Moscow)
  Andrei Solomatin (CSKA Moscow)
  Orlando Calisto de Souza (Rubin)

Defensive midfielders
  Evgeni Aldonin (Rotor)
  Vladimir Maminov (Lokomotiv Moscow)
  Elvir Rahimić (CSKA Moscow)

Right wingers
  Rolan Gusev (CSKA Moscow)
  Denis Boyarintsev (Rubin)
  Vladimir Bystrov (Zenit)

Central midfielders
  Dmitri Loskov (Lokomotiv Moscow)
  Jiří Jarošík (CSKA Moscow)
  Yegor Titov (Spartak Moscow)

Left wingers
  Andrei Karyaka (Krylia Sovetov)
  Marat Izmailov (Lokomotiv Moscow)
  Aleksandr Pavlenko (Spartak Moscow)

Right forwards
  Valery Yesipov (Rotor)
  Dmitri Bulykin (Dynamo Moscow)
  Mikheil Ashvetia (Lokomotiv Moscow)

Left forwards
  Aleksandr Kerzhakov (Zenit)
  Ivica Olić (CSKA Moscow)
  Roni (Rubin)

Medal squads

See also 
2003 in Russian football

References

External links 
 RSSSF

2003
1
Russia
Russia